Donald W. Sherburne (April 21, 1929 – April 21, 2021) was an American philosopher and Emeritus Professor of Philosophy, Vanderbilt University. He was a former president of the Metaphysical Society of America (1994).

References

1929 births
2021 deaths
20th-century American philosophers
Philosophy academics
Presidents of the Metaphysical Society of America
People from Proctor, Vermont